Airtime Products was an Australian aircraft manufacturer based in Airlie Beach, Queensland. The company specialized in the design and manufacture of paramotors and powered hang gliders in the form of ready-to-fly aircraft for the US FAR 103 Ultralight Vehicles rules as well as the European and Australian microlight categories.

The company was active in the mid-2000s but by 2015 had gone out of business.

The company produced a range of paramotors, including the Discovery series. These were originally powered by the Radne Raket 120, but were under-powered and that powerplant was replaced by the Cors'Air M21Y and Per Il Volo Top 80 instead. The company's paramotor designs were noted for their four-part chassis that can split apart for transport.

Aircraft

References

Defunct aircraft manufacturers of Australia
Ultralight aircraft
Powered hang gliders
Powered parachutes
Paramotors